The Shkotovka (formerly: Цимухе Tsimukhe) is a river in Primorsky Krai, Russia. It rises in the south of the Sikhote-Alin range (Bolshoy Vorobey Range) and flows into the Ussuri Bay of the Sea of Japan near the urban-type settlement of Shkotovo.

It was named after Nikolay Shkot in 1972. The former name of river was Tsimukhe (Qimu River).

The localities of Shkotovo, Novorossiya, Tsentralnoye, and Novaya Moskva stand on the river's bank.

References

Rivers of Primorsky Krai
Drainage basins of the Sea of Japan